Ganjlik is a Baku Metro station. It was opened on 6 November 1967. Also there is a direct exit from the metro to the shopping mall called as Ganjlik Mall.

See also
List of Baku metro stations

References

Baku Metro stations
Railway stations opened in 1967
1967 establishments in Azerbaijan